The Fruits of Fascism: Postwar Prosperity in Historical Perspective is a 1990 book by a professor of International Affairs, Simon Reich.

It describes the difference in the economic success of nations in post World War II Europe. The book links the effects of globalization of democratic nations and contrasts them with the economic growth of non-globalized nations which emerged from fascist regimes.
It implies that globalization by international mergers of privately owned corporate legal bodies might form the basis for future tyranny through the monetary system.

See also
World government
Zeitgeist, a film portraying some aspects of this book

External links
on Google Books

1990 non-fiction books
Books about fascism
Cornell University Press books
Economics books
English-language books